The following list is a discography of production by Mike WiLL Made It, an American hip hop record producer from Atlanta, Georgia. It includes a list of songs produced, co-produced and remixed by year, artist, album and title. He has produced multiple singles certified gold or higher by the Recording Industry Association of America (RIAA), including two US Billboard number one hit singles.

Singles produced

Other production

References

External links 
 

Discographies of American artists
Production discographies
Hip hop discographies